Stanislaus Herzel (born 5 August 1990) is a German footballer who plays for SV Seligenporten. Besides playing for the youth teams of 1. FC Pleinfeld and 1. FC Nürnberg, he also played for SSV Jahn Regensburg in the Under 19 Bundesliga before joining FC Ingolstadt in 2009. With Ingolstadt's second team he gained promotion to the Regionalliga Süd in 2011. After playing four seasons for Ingolstadt II, he moved to Augsburg and played one season with FC Augsburg II in the Regionalliga Bayern. In summer 2014, Herzel returned to Regensburg and made his professional debut on 26 July 2014 in a 3. Liga match against MSV Duisburg. Regensburg won the match 3–1.

References

External links
 

1990 births
Living people
German footballers
SSV Jahn Regensburg players
3. Liga players
Association football defenders
SSV Jahn Regensburg II players